The red-capped coua (Coua ruficeps) is a species of cuckoo in the family Cuculidae.
It is endemic to Madagascar.

Its natural habitats are subtropical or tropical dry forest and subtropical or tropical moist lowland forest.

Subspecies
Coua ruficeps olivaceiceps - sometimes elevated to the species level as Olive-capped coua

References

Coua
red-capped coua
red-capped coua
Taxonomy articles created by Polbot